Thomas Loughran may refer to:

 Tommy Loughran (1902–1982), American boxer
 Thomas P. Loughran Jr., American physician-scientist